Independent Commission or Commissioner Against Corruption may refer to:
Independent Commission Against Corruption (Mauritius), established in 2002
Independent Commission Against Corruption (Hong Kong), established in 1974 
Commissioner of the Independent Commission Against Corruption, a post in Hong Kong
Independent Commission Against Corruption (New South Wales), Australia, established in 1988 
Independent Commissioner Against Corruption (Northern Territory), Australia, established in 2018
Independent Commission Against Corruption (South Australia), established in 2013 
Fiji Independent Commission Against Corruption, established 2007
Korea Independent Commission Against Corruption, established in 2002, merged into Anti-Corruption and Civil Rights Commission in 2008

See also
 Commission Against Corruption (Macau), established in 1999.
 Commission for the Prevention of Corruption of the Republic of Slovenia

Anti-corruption agencies